Johann Michael Sattler (28 September 1786, Herzogenburg – 28 September 1847, Mattsee) was an Austrian portrait and landscape painter, best known for his large-scale panoramas.

Life and work
He began his studies in 1804, at the Academy of Fine Arts, Vienna, where his primary instructor was Hubert Maurer. Initially, he worked as a portrait painter. In 1816, he married Anna Maria Kittenberger, Maurer's foster daughter. Three years later, he moved to Salzburg. In 1824, he was commissioned to paint a portrait of Emnperor Francis II, who was there on a visit. He was so impressed by Sattler's talent and the beauty of the city, that he expressed a desire to see Salzburg with its romantic surroundings presented as a panorama.

That same year, he began making sketches. He was named an honorary citizen in appreciation. This was followed by an extended tour throughout Europe, accompanied by his wife and two children, "with 30 tons and crossing approximately 30,000 kilometres of land and water, a feat no one had ever done before me and one which would be difficult to repeat in the future". It was shown until 1839, and made a significant contribution to the tourism industry in Salzburg.

His son, Hubert, donated the panorama to the city of Salzburg in 1870. Later, it was moved to the Salzburg Museum and was severely damaged when the building was destroyed during World War II.

References

Further reading
 
 Josef Gassner: Die Ehrenbürger der Landeshauptstadt Salzburg. Katalog zur 10. Sonderausstellung; Selbstverlag des Museums Carolino Augusteum, Salzburg 1954, S. ?.
 
 Erich Marx, Peter Laub (Eds.): "Das Salzburg-Panorama von Johann Michael Sattler", Vol.1: Das Werk und sein Schöpfer, Salzburg 2005

External links 

 (German) Ein neues Museum für Sattlers Salzburg-Panorama, Salzburg Museum
 
 

19th-century Austrian painters
19th-century Austrian male artists
Austrian male painters
Austrian landscape painters
1786 births
1847 deaths
Academy of Fine Arts Vienna alumni
People from Lower Austria
Physicians from Salzburg
Austrian portrait painters